Walther Kadow (January 29, 1900 — May 31, 1923) was a German school teacher who was severely beaten and then murdered by having his throat slit and then shot in the head, by Rudolf Höss and a group of Nazi Party accomplices in May 1923 in the forest near Parchim. Kadow was a member of the right wing German Völkisch Freedom Party, and was suspected of having betrayed German nationalist Albert Leo Schlageter to the French occupation authorities in the Ruhr. Schlageter was executed by the French and was later regarded as a martyr by the Nazis. Höss received a ten-year sentence for the revenge killing, although he was released after four years due to a general amnesty. His accomplice, Martin Bormann, who was a former student of Kadow, was sentenced to one year in prison for his part in the murder.

Bormann would later become Head of the Nazi Party Chancellery and private secretary to Adolf Hitler and would later receive the Blood Order for his imprisonment over the murder. Höss later became commandant of Auschwitz concentration camp.

References

German murder victims
German schoolteachers
1923 deaths
People murdered in Germany
Deaths by beating in Europe
1860 births